The Jinci or Jin Temple (晉祠) is the most prominent temple complex in Shanxi, China.  It is located 16 miles (25 km) southwest of Taiyuan at the foot of Xuanweng Mountain at the Jin Springs. It was founded about 1,400 years ago and expanded during the following centuries, resulting in a diverse collection of more than 100 sculptures, buildings, terraces, and bridges.  

The best known structure at Jinci is the Hall of the Holy Mother (圣母殿, Shèngmǔdiàn), which was constructed from 1023 to  during the Song dynasty. It has carved wooden dragons coiled around the eight pillars that support its upward-curving double-eave roof. The complex includes a classical garden with a 3,000-year-old cypress dating from the Zhou Dynasty. To the west of  Hall of the Holy Mother is a temple dedicated to the deity Shuimu.

References

External links

 Jin Shrines, Architectura Sinica Site Archive

Major National Historical and Cultural Sites in Shanxi
Taiyuan
Song dynasty architecture
Jin (Chinese state)